Ginseng tea, or insam-cha ( insam means ginseng and cha means tea in Korean), is a traditional Korean tea made with ginseng. While it is called a tea, ginseng tea does not contain tea leaves. It is a herbal tea infusion made out of the ginseng plant's root.
Ginseng is a perennial herb derived from the aromatic root of Panax Ginseng Meyer, also known as Korean ginseng. Ginseng grows in shady forests that are cool and damp. It is a slow-growing plant and is difficult to cultivate. It can take four to six years before the root is ready to be harvested. Ginseng roots have a forked and twisted appearance that somewhat resembles the human body.

Ginseng roots have been used in East Asian countries for more than 2,000 years. The roots can be used fresh; however, there are various forms which can be processed in different ways for different uses. Fresh roots can be processed into red ginseng (홍삼, hongsam) by steaming and drying, or into white ginseng (백삼, paeksam) by a simpler process of air-drying.

Preparation 
Ginseng roots are often ground or powdered but also can be soaked to make an extract or herbal tincture. Tea can be made from the ground ginseng.

Ginseng tea is traditionally prepared with Korean ginseng along with jujubes and dried Korean chestnuts. These are decocted for several hours over a low heat, sweetened with honey, and served with Korean pine nuts floating on top. Either fresh ginseng or red ginseng can be used.

Ginseng tea can be found in a fine dry-powder packaged form or a dried grated form.

History 
Ginseng was sought after in the ancient East Asian world. During the Warring States period of China (475–221 BC), the preparation of ginseng tea was associated with good health and high status. During the Ming era (1368—1644), Li Shizen documented Korean ginseng tea in his "Great Compendium of Herbs". The 21st monarch of the Joseon Dynasty, King Yeongju, drank Geongongtang—a ginseng-infused tea—to preserve his health. In the Annals of King Jeongjo (1776–1800) which is part of the Joseon Dynasty Annals, the term "red ginseng" was recorded. The popularity of ginseng reached the western world according to text written as early as 1274 referencing Marco Polo canonizing it in different forms such as syrups, powders, roots, and as a tea.

During the Goryeo dynasty, ginseng tea is documented as a way to strengthen the body of the user to resist stress-related illnesses or complications.

Risks 
A medical professional should be consulted before taking ginseng. Ginseng may cause interactions with blood thinning and anti-coagulant medications such as dalteparin (Fragmin), ticlopidine (Ticlid), warfarin (Coumodin), clopidogrel (Plavix), aspirin; nonsteroidal anti-inflammatory drugs and blood pressure medications. Since ginseng can lower blood sugar levels, people with type 2 diabetes and those taking insulin or other medications that also lower blood sugar, should be monitored if they start taking ginseng. It is not recommended to give ginseng to children or adolescents.

Benefits 
As a widely popular natural health item amongst Koreans, red ginseng in particular is available in various forms such as liquid, capsule, powder, round root, and even candies like jelly. Fans of this supplement consume it to relieve fatigue, increase natural immunity, and improve blood circulation. Of these benefits and other believed benefits, only five uses have been officially recognized by a Korean national agency; the Ministry of Food and Drug Safety. The five officially recognized benefits are: immunity enhancement, fatigue improvement, blood circulation improvement, memory enhancement, and antioxidant action.

Immunity enhancement from the use of Korean red ginseng results from the ginseng stimulating the naturally occurring macrophages in the body that assist in removing unwanted viruses from the human body, a benefit claimed by Professor Lee Dong-kwon from Sungkyunkwan University College of Pharmacy. Trials led by Professor Kim Hyung-jun at Semyung University Oriental Medicine Hospital backed up this claim when a human trial involving 2g dosages to 99 subjects led to an overall increase in the number of white blood cells after 8 weeks of ginseng administration.

Fatigue improvement is a benefit that results from the effects of ginseng in the muscle, where lactic acid is suppressed by ginseng having properties that reduce the free radicals that would otherwise promote accumulation of lactic acid leading to fatigued post-exercise.

The claim of improved blood circulation comes from a result of findings where the consumption of Korean red ginseng appears to expand blood vessels through an increase in the creation of nitric oxide within them. Further recognized by the Ministry of Food and Drug Safety in Korea is the inhibition of aggregation helping to reduce blood clots in the vessels.

Currently at least two trials have been run to test the effectiveness of ginseng on memory cognition and in both trials, adults who were given ginseng showed a significant increase in memory function compared to their placebo groups. One trial was conducted by Professor Kim Man-ho at Seoul National University College of Medicine and the other was conducted under Professor David Ormonde Kennedy at Northumbria University.

The fifth and final officially recognized benefit of ginseng: antioxidation, comes from research reported by Professor Lee Jong-ho from the Department of Food and Nutrition within Yonsei University. According to his team, ‘it reduced the DNA damage of lymphocytes and increased the activity of antioxidant enzymes…’

According to the Journal of Ethnopharmacology, ginseng, regardless of where it is grown or cultivated from is believed to provide tonic rejuvenation, antioxidation, antifatigue, and neuroprotective properties to the consumer; implying the location ginseng is grown should have no effect on the probable benefits.

However, all research and claims still lack extensive research and trials and a medical professional should be consulted prior to beginning treatment or supplementary care utilizing red ginseng in any form or quantity.

See also 
 Insam-ju, Korean ginseng wine or liquor

References 

Herbal tea
Korean tea